The N809 or Barishal-Bhola-Lakshmipur Highway is a Bangladeshi National Highway between the divisional city of Barishal and the town of Lakshmipur, via the town of Bhola. It starts from N8 near University of Barishal and ends at R140 (Comilla-Lalmai-Chandpur-Lakhmipur-Begumganj Road) in Lakshmipur.

See also
 N8 (Bangladesh)
 List of roads in Bangladesh

References

National Highways in Bangladesh